Chinese noodles vary widely according to the region of production, ingredients, shape or width, and manner of preparation. Noodles were invented in China, and are an essential ingredient and staple in Chinese cuisine. They are an important part of most regional cuisines within China, and other countries with sizable overseas Chinese populations. Chinese noodles can be made of wheat, buckwheat, rice, millet, oats, beans, potatoes, sweet potatoes, and even fish. There are over 1,200 types of noodles commonly consumed in China today.

Chinese noodles have also entered the cuisines of neighboring East Asian countries such as Korea and Japan, as well as Southeast Asian countries such as Vietnam, Cambodia, and Thailand.

Nomenclature

Nomenclature of Chinese noodles can be difficult due to the vast spectrum available in China and the many dialects of Chinese used to name them. In Mandarin, miàn (often transliterated as "mien" or "mein" ) refers to noodles made from wheat flour, while fěn or "fun" refers to noodles made from other starches, particularly rice flour and mung bean starch. Each noodle type can be rendered in pinyin for Mandarin, but in Hong Kong and neighboring Guangdong it will be known by its Cantonese pronunciation ("meen" or "mien" for wheat noodles, "fun" for non-wheat). Taiwan, Malaysia, Singapore and many other Overseas Chinese communities in Southeast Asia may use Hokkien (Min Nan) instead (e.g. "mee" for wheat noodles). Wheat noodles, for example, are called mian in Mandarin, mein in Cantonese, men in Japanese, mee in Thai and gougsou in Korean.

Sometimes, the principal ingredient used in the preparation such as wheat, buckwheat, rice, potato, corn flour, bean, soybean flour, yam flour, mung-bean starch, sweet potato, cassava, etc may also form the basis of naming noodles.

History

The earliest written record of noodles is from a book dated to the Eastern Han period (25–220 CE). Noodles, often made from wheat dough, became a prominent staple of food during the Han dynasty. In the Western Han Dynasty, due to demand by the military, it was necessary for the Government to implement food processing technologies that would make the food storage easier and more affordable. During this time, “Laomian” emerged, it was made with starch-rich buckwheat, millet and pea flours with lower water content, making it easier to store and transport.

During the Song dynasty (960–1279) noodle shops were very popular in the cities, and remained open all night. During the earlier dynastic periods Chinese wheat noodles were known as "soup cake", as explained by the Song dynasty scholar Huáng Cháo Yīng (黃朝英) mentions in his work "A delightful mixed discussion on various scholarly topics" (Scroll 2) that in ancient times bready foods like pasta are referred collectively as "bing" and differentiated through their cooking methods.·

Up until 1992, most dried Chinese noodles in the United States could not be sold labelled as "noodles". This is due to fact that many Chinese noodles are made without eggs and do not always use wheat as starch, thus resulting in the United States Department of Agriculture obliging manufacturers to label them as "imitation noodles" or "alimentary paste".

Production
Chinese noodles are generally made from either wheat flour, rice flour, or mung bean starch, with wheat noodles being more commonly produced and consumed in northern China and rice noodles being more typical of southern China. Egg, lye, and cereal may also be added to noodles made from wheat flour in order to give the noodles a different color or flavor. Egg whites, arrowroot or tapioca starch are sometimes added to the flour mixture in low quantities to change the texture and tenderness of the noodles' strands. Although illegal, the practice of adding the chemical cross-linker borax to whiten noodles and improve their texture is also quite common in East Asia. In general, the Chinese noodles cooking method involves making a dough with flour, salt, and water; mixing the dough by hand to form bar shapes; bending the bars for proofing; pulling the bars into strips; dropping the strips into a pot with boiling water; and removing the noodles when finished cooking. Chinese type noodles are generally made from hard wheat flours, characterized by bright creamy white or bright yellow color and firm texture.

Before the automatic noodle machine was invented in 1950s, the processing of Chinese noodles were made with four steps, including:
 Fresh – The noodles are often consumed within 24 hours of manufacture due to quick discoloration. Their shelf life can be extended to 3–5 days if stored under refrigeration;
 Dried – Fresh noodle strands are dried by sunlight or in a controlled chamber;
 Boiled – Fresh noodle strands are either parboiled or fully cooked. After parboiling, Chinese noodles are rinsed in cold water, drained and covered with 1–2% vegetable oil to prevent sticking;
 Steamed – Fresh alkaline noodle strands are steamed in a steamer and softened with water through rinsing.

The dough for noodles made from wheat flour is typically made from wheat flour, salt, and water, with the addition of eggs or lye depending on the desired texture and taste of the noodles. Rice or other starch-based noodles are typically made with only the starch or rice flour and water. After the formation of a pliable dough mass, one of five types of mechanical processing may be applied to produce the noodles:

While cut and extruded noodles can be dried to create a shelf-stable product to be eaten months after production, most peeled, pulled and kneaded noodles are consumed shortly after they are produced.

Cooking

Noodles may be cooked from either their fresh (moist) or dry forms. They are generally boiled, although they may also be deep-fried in oil until crispy. Boiled noodles may then be stir fried, served with sauce or other accompaniments, or served in soup, often with meat and other ingredients. Certain rice-noodles are made directly from steaming the raw rice slurry and are only consumed fresh.

Unlike many Western noodles and pastas, Chinese noodles made from wheat flour are usually made from salted dough, and therefore do not require the addition of salt to the liquid in which they are boiled. Chinese noodles also cook very quickly, generally requiring less than 5 minutes to become al dente and some taking less than a minute to finish cooking, with thinner noodles requiring less time to cook. Chinese noodles made from rice or mung bean starch do not generally contain salt.

Types

Wheat
These noodles are made only with wheat flour and water. If the intended product is dried noodles, salt is almost always added to the recipe.

Lye-water or egg
These wheat flour noodles are more chewy in texture and yellow in color either due to the addition of lye (sodium carbonate, potassium carbonate, calcium hydroxide, or potassium hydroxide) and/or egg (either using only the egg white, yolk, or both). This class of lye-water noodles has a subtle but distinctive smell and taste, described by some as being "eggy".

Rice
Rice-based noodles can be: 
Extruded from a paste and steamed into strands of noodles
Steamed from a slurry into sheets and then sliced into strands
These noodles are typically made only with rice and water without the addition of salt. Although unorthodox, some producers may choose to add other plant starches to modify the texture of the noodles.

Starch

These noodles are made using various plant starches. Mung bean starch noodles will often be cut with tapioca starch to make them more chewy and reduce production costs.

Oat

In China, particularly in western Inner Mongolia and Shanxi province, oat (Avena nuda) flour is called yóu miàn (莜面), and is processed into noodles or thin-walled rolls, which are consumed as staple food. The process of making oat noodles is special. The oat dough is twisted on a marble plate which can ensure the dough will not stick on it, into strips and thin-rolls. It can be boiled and also steamed with different sauces to eat.

Millet 
The oldest archaeological evidence of noodles shows that they came from China and were made from millet, which is an indigenous crop to northern China. In 2005, a team of archaeologists reported finding an earthenware bowl that contained 4000-year-old noodles at the Lajia archaeological site. These noodles were said to resemble lamian, a type of Chinese noodle. Analyzing the husk phytoliths and starch grains present in the sediment associated with the noodles, they were identified as millet belonging to Panicum miliaceum and Setaria italica.

Chinese noodle dishes

The following are a small portion of Chinese dishes that incorporate noodles:
Ban mian
Beef chow fun
Cart noodle
Char kway teow
Chow mein
Laksa
Lo mein
Re gan mian
Wonton noodles
Zhajiangmian

See also

 Chinese cuisine
 Japanese noodles
 Korean noodles
 List of noodles
 List of noodle dishes
 Noodle soup

References

External links
 Cook's Thesaurus: Asian Noodles

 
Articles containing video clips